Ski Stadion is a multi-use stadium in Ski, Norway. It is currently used for track and field meets hosted by Ski IL and for association football matches, being the home ground of Follo FK.

External links

Ski Stadion - Nordic Stadiums

Football venues in Norway
Athletics (track and field) venues in Norway
Sports venues in Viken
Ski, Norway